Auden is both a surname and a given name. Notable people with the name include:

Surname
 George Augustus Auden (1872–1957), English physician
 John Bicknell Auden (1903–1991), English geologist and explorer, for whom Auden's Col in the Himalayas is named
 John Auden (1894–1959), English solicitor, soldier and collector
 Tony Auden (fl. from 2005), an Australian meteorologist
 W. H. Auden (Wystan Hugh Auden, 1907–1973), Anglo-American poet

Given name
Auden Grogins (born 1962), an American politician
Auden Schendler, American climate activist
Auden Tate, American football player
Auden Thornton (born 1988), an American actress

See also

Auden (disambiguation)